is a retired volleyball player from Japan, who was one of the key players in the Japan men's national volleyball team in the 2000s. On club level, he only played for Panasonic Panthers.

Yamamoto plays as a wing-spiker and was named Best Scorer and Best Server at the 2008 Olympic Qualification Tournament.

Honours
2001 FIVB World League — 9th place
2001 World Grand Champions Cup — 5th place
2002 FIVB World League — 13th place
2002 World Championship — 9th place
2003 FIVB World League — 13th place
2003 FIVB World Cup — 9th place
2004 FIVB World League — 10th place
2006 World Championship — 8th place
 2008 Olympic Qualification Tournament — 2nd place (qualified)

Individual awards
 2003 FIVB World Cup — Most Valuable Player
 2003 FIVB World Cup — Best Scorer

References

Sources
 FIVB biography

1978 births
Living people
Japanese men's volleyball players
People from Tottori Prefecture
Sportspeople from Tottori Prefecture
Olympic volleyball players of Japan
Volleyball players at the 2008 Summer Olympics
Volleyball players at the 2006 Asian Games
Asian Games competitors for Japan
Opposite hitters
21st-century Japanese people